David Walter Adamany (September 23, 1936 – November 10, 2016) was the 8th president of Wayne State University, serving from 1983 to 1997. One of Wayne State University's libraries, David Adamany Undergraduate Library, was his creation. 
Subsequently, Adamany later served as head of the Detroit Public School District from 1999 to 2000.
He was Temple University's eighth president, serving from 2000 to 2006. David Adamany died Thursday November 10, 2016.

Early life
Adamany was born in Janesville, Wisconsin, on September 23, 1936, to Walter Joseph and Dora Marie Adamany, both of Lebanese immigrant descent. He was the oldest of four Adamany children, including one brother and two sisters.

After graduating from high school, he received a full scholarship to Harvard University, where he completed his degree in government (magna cum laude, 1958) and juris doctor (J.D.) degree from Harvard Law School (1961). He continued his education at the University of Wisconsin at Madison, under the advisement and mentorship of Dr. Leon Epstein, where he received a Ph.D. in political science in 1967.

Early career
His early career was in the state of Wisconsin as special assistant to the attorney general (1961-1963) and pardon counsel to governor John W. Reynolds (1963). At the age of 27, he was appointed as a member of Wisconsin's public service commission (1963-1965). In Wisconsin governor Patrick J. Lucey's administration, David served as special advisor to the governor and Wisconsin secretary of revenue (1973-1976).

Academic career
After graduating from the University of Wisconsin, David joined Wesleyan University, where he served as professor of government (1967-1972) and dean of the college (1969-1970). He returned to the University of Wisconsin, Madison, to serve as professor of political science (1972-1977), before going on to serve California State University at Long Beach as professor of political science and vice president for academic affairs (1977-1980).

During 1980–1982, David joined the University of Maryland system as professor of political science at the College Park and Baltimore County campuses, as well as vice president of academic affairs for the entire university system.

He joined Wayne State University as its President in 1982, where he served until 1997. After leaving Wayne State University, Adamany served as Chief Executive Officer of the Detroit Public Schools, 1999–2000, before becoming the eighth president of Temple University in Philadelphia, Pennsylvania, where he served for six years.

From 2004–2016, he served as a member of the Board of Visitors for Political Science at the University of Wisconsin, Madison.

Gay Pioneer
Adamany was openly gay, and in 1998 was recognized with a Distinguished Alumni Award by the University of Wisconsin Alumni Association's Gay, Lesbian, and Bisexual Council. In 2000, the Arab Community Center for Economic and Social Services honored him as Arab American of the Year.

Education
A.B., J.D., Harvard University
M.A., Ph.D., University of Wisconsin-Madison

References

|-

1936 births
2016 deaths
Presidents of Temple University
Harvard Law School alumni
Presidents of Wayne State University
University of Wisconsin–Madison College of Letters and Science alumni
American political scientists
People from Janesville, Wisconsin